Hajj (or variant spellings) is an annual Islamic pilgrimage to Mecca.

Hajj may also refer to:

People

Hajj
 Adnan Hajj, Lebanese freelance photographer
 Hajj Nematollah (1871–1920), Kurdish mystic
 Hussein Hajj Hassan (born 1960), Lebanese politician
 Francois Hajj (1953–2007), a Lebanese general

Al Hajj, El Hajj
 El Hajj Muhammad El Anka (1907–1978), Algerian chaabi musician
 Sami al Hajj (born 1969), Sudanese journalist for the Al Jazeera network
 Ounsi el- Hajj (1937–2014), Lebanese poet
 El-Hajj Al-Malik El Shabazz (1925–1965), the Muslim name of Malcolm X, American black nationalist and human rights activist
 Abdu Ali al Haji Sharqawi (born 1974), Yemeni detainee at the U.S. Guantanamo Bay detention camp in Cuba

Hadj
 Hadj Boudella (born 1965), former detainee at the U.S. Guantanamo Bay detainment camp in Cuba

Al Hadj, El Hadj
El Hadj Umar Tall (1794–1864), West African political leader, Islamic scholar, and military commander

Other uses
 Al-Hajj, 22nd chapter (sūrah) of the Qur'an
 Hajj Qeshlaq, a village in Zanjan Province, Iran
 Hajj (album), 1986 album by Muslimgauze
 Hajj (film), 2013 Indian Kannada language film directed by Nikhil Manjoo

See also
 Hage (disambiguation)
 Haj (disambiguation)
 Hajji, a Muslim person who has successfully completed the Hajj to Mecca
 Hajji (disambiguation)

Arabic masculine given names
Arabic-language surnames